Finding Carter is an American drama television series, which aired on MTV from July 8, 2014, to December 15, 2015. The series was created by Emily Silver, and stars Kathryn Prescott in the lead role of Carter Stevens, a young girl whose life is turned upside-down after learning that the woman she thought was her mother, abducted her from her biological family when she was three years old. With this newfound information, Carter is then returned to, and attempts to fit in with, the family she never knew she had.

All episodes of the first season are named after notable films of different eras. For the first half of the second season, all the episodes are named after notable songs. The second half of the second season features episodes named after novels.

Series overview

Episodes

Season 1 (2014)

Season 2 (2015)

References

External links

Lists of American teen drama television series episodes